Kalyani may refer to:

Film and television
 Kalyani (1940 film), a Hindi film
 Kalyani (1952 film), a Tamil film
 Kalyani (1971 film), a Kannada film
 Kalyani (1979 film), a Telugu film
 Kalyani (1983 film), an Oriya Ollywood film
 Kalyani (TV series), an Indian Telugu language soap opera

Places
 Kalyani, Dakshin Dinajpur, West Bengal, India
 Kalyani, Raebareli, a village in Uttar Pradesh, India
 Kalyani, West Bengal, a city in the Nadia district of West Bengal, India
 Kalyani Dam, in Tirupati, Andhra Pradesh, India
 Kalyani Nagar, a neighbourhood in Pune, Maharashtra, India
 Kalyani River, in Barabanki district, Uttar Pradesh, India
 Kalyani subdivision, Nadia district, West Bengal, India
 Ancient name for Basavakalyan, Karnataka, India

People
 Baba Kalyani (born 1949), Indian businessman
 Galyani Vadhana (1923–2008), princess of Thailand
 Shrikant Kalyani (born 1964), Indian cricketer
 Kalyani Bondre (born 1981), academic and Indian classical vocalist
 Kalyani Das (1907–1983), Indian revolutionary and nationalist from Bengal
 Kalyani Dhokarikar (born 1971), Indian cricketer
 Karate Kalyani, Indian character actor and comedian
 Kalyani Marella, Indian Kabaddi player
 Kalyani Menon (born 1951), Indian playback singer
 Kalyani Nair, Indian singer
 Kalyani Priyadarshan, Indian film actress
 Kalyani Roy (born 1967), Indian politician
 Kalyani Varadarajan, composer of Carnatic music
 Kalyani (actress), South Indian actress
 Poornitha (born 1990), South Indian actress also known as Kalyani

Other uses
 Kalyani Chalukya, an Indian dynasty
 Kalyani (goddess), a name of Hindu goddess Parvathi
 Kalyani Group, an Indian industrial conglomerate
 Kalyani (raga), a rāga in the Carnatic music of South India as well as Hindustani music
 Kalyani (well), a temple tank in Hindu temples
 Kalyani (Vidhan Sabha constituency), an assembly constituency in Nadia district, West Bengal
 Kalyani Stadium, a stadium in Kalyani, West Bengal

See also
 Kalyan (disambiguation)